This is a list of adaptations of Anna Karenina, the 1877 novel by Leo Tolstoy.

Theatre
 1992: Helen Edmundson's adaptation was produced by Shared Experience for a touring production. Edmundson won a Time Out Award for Outstanding Theatrical Event of 1992, and a TMA Award.

Film
 1911: Anna Karenina (1911 film), a French/Russian adaptation directed by Maurice André Maître.
 1914: Anna Karenina (1914 film), a Russian adaptation directed by Vladimir Gardin.
 1915: Anna Karenina (1915 film), an American version starring Danish actress Betty Nansen.
 1917: "Daughter of Anna Karenina" (Дочь Анны Карениной), by screenwriter, director Alexander Arkatov.
 1918: Anna Karenina (1918 film), a Hungarian adaptation directed by Márton Garas.
 1920: Anna Karenina (1920 film), a German silent historical film directed by Frederic Zelnik and starring Lya Mara, Johannes Riemann, and Heinrich Peer.
 1927: Love (1927 film), an American version, starring Greta Garbo and directed by Edmund Goulding. This version featured significant changes from the novel and had two different endings, with a happy one for American audiences.
 1935: Anna Karenina (1935 film), one of the most famous and critically acclaimed version, starring Greta Garbo and Fredric March and directed by Clarence Brown.
 1948: Anna Karenina (1948 film) starring Vivien Leigh, Ralph Richardson and directed by Julien Duvivier.
 1953: Anna Karenina (1953 film), a Russian version directed by Tatyana Lukashevich.
 1954: Panakkaari, a Tamil language adaptation directed by K. S. Gopalakrishnan
 1960: Nahr al-Hob (River of Love), an Egyptian movie directed by Ezzel Dine Zulficar
 1967: Anna Karenina (1967 film), a Russian version directed by Alexander Zarkhi with music by Rodion Shchedrin.
 1976: Anna Karenina, a Russian ballet version directed by Margarita Pilikhina.
 1985: Anna Karenina (1985 film), a U.S. TV movie starring Jacqueline Bisset and Christopher Reeve, directed by Simon Langton.
 1997: Anna Karenina (1997 film), the first American version to be filmed entirely on locations in Russia, directed by Bernard Rose and starring Sophie Marceau and Sean Bean.
see also Anna Karenina (soundtrack), the soundtrack of the 1997 film
 2012: Anna Karenina (2012 film), one of the most popular British versions directed by Joe Wright, starring Keira Knightley.

Television
 1961: Anna Karenina, a BBC Television adaptation directed by Rudolph Cartier, starring Claire Bloom and Sean Connery.
 1977: Anna Karenina, a ten-episode BBC series, directed by Basil Coleman and starred Nicola Pagett, Eric Porter and Stuart Wilson.
 2000: Anna Karenina, a four-part British Channel 4 TV adaptation directed by David Blair and starring Helen McCrory. Aired in America on PBS Masterpiece Theatre in 2001.
 2013: Anna KareNina, a Filipino drama series directed by Gina Alajar
 2013: Anna Karenina, an Italian version for the Rai 1 network, directed by Christian Duguay and starring Vittoria Puccini
 2015: The Beautiful Lie, an Australian mini-series aired on the ABC.
Upcoming Netflix miniseries is set in 21st century in Russia with Svetlana Khodchenkova in lead role

Ballet
 1972: Anna Karenina, a ballet with original music by Rodion Shchedrin, choreographed by Maya Plisetskaya (solo scenes) together with Natalya Ryzhenko and Viktor Smirnov-Golovanov (mass scenes). The music draws upon the composer's own score for the 1967 film and uses a fragment from Bellini's I Capuleti e i Montecchi.
 2005: Anna Karenina, a Russian ballet choreographed by Boris Eifman, with music by Tchaikovsky.
 2018: Anna Karenina, a ballet by John Neumeier inspired by Leo Tolstoy; music by Tchaikovsky, Alfred Schnittke and Cat Stevens/Yusuf Islam
 2019: Anna Karenina, choreography by Yuri Possokhov, music by Ilya Demutsky

Musical theatre
 1992: Anna Karenina, an ill-fated Broadway musical adaptation.
 1994: Anna Karenina, musical by Hungarian authors Tibor Kocsák (music) and Tibor Miklós (book and lyrics)
2016: Anna Karenina, an original Russian-language musical produced by the Moscow Operetta Theatre (live-recording filmed in 2018).

Opera
 1914: Karenina Anna by Hungarian composer Jenő Hubay, premièred in 1923, to a libretto by Sándor Góth and Andor Gábor based on Edmond Guiraud's play drawn from Tolstoy's novel.
 1970: Anna Karenina by Ukrainian composer Yuly Sergeyevich Meytus.
 1978: Anna Karenina by Scottish composer Iain Hamilton on his own libretto, premièred by ENO at the London Coliseum in 1981.
 2007: Anna Karenina, an American opera with music by David Carlson on a libretto by Colin Graham which premiered in 2007 at Florida Grand Opera. Second version with an added scene on text by Mark Streshinsky was premièred in 2010 by Opera San Jose.

Literature
Android Karenina, a mashup novel by Ben H. Winters.

References

Adaptations of works by Leo Tolstoy
Literature lists
Anna Karenina
Russian literature-related lists